The Menzelya (Minzälä) is a river in Tatarstan, Russian Federation, a former left-bank tributary of the river Ik, which flows into the Nizhnekamsk Reservoir.

The river's source is at the village , Sarmanovsky District, Tatarstan.

The maximal mineralization is 400-800 mg/L. The average sediment deposition at the river mouth per year reaches . Drainage is regulated. Since 1978 it is protected as a natural monument of Tatarstan.

The town of Menzelinsk is located near the river's mouth. The notable landmark of the river and the town is an abandoned railway bridge, where the railway was never installed.

References 

Rivers of Tatarstan